The Battle of Nikiou was a battle between Arab Muslim troops under General Amr ibn al-A'as and the Byzantine Empire in Egypt in May of 646.

Overview
Following their victory at the Battle of Heliopolis in July 640, and the subsequent capitulation of Alexandria in November 641, Arab troops had taken over what was the Roman province of Egypt. The newly installed Eastern Roman Emperor Constans II was determined to retake the land, and ordered a large fleet to carry troops to Alexandria. These troops, under Manuel, took the city by surprise from its small Arab garrison towards the end of 645 in an amphibious attack. In 645, the Byzantine thus temporarily won Alexandria back. Amr at the time might have been in Mecca, and was quickly recalled to take command of the Arab forces in Egypt.

The battle took place at the small fortified town of Nikiou ( Pashati), about two-thirds of the way from Alexandria to Fustat, with the Arab forces numbering around 15,000, against a smaller Byzantine force. The Arabs prevailed, and the Byzantine forces retreated in disarray, back to Alexandria.

Although the Byzantines closed the gates against the pursuing Arabs, the city of Alexandria eventually fell to the Arabs, who stormed the city sometime in the summer of that year. The defeat of Manuel's forces marked the last attempt by the Byzantine Empire to recapture Egypt for some 500 years, with only Emperor Manuel I Komnenos sending a failed expedition there in the 12th century.

References

Further reading
 Butler, Alfred J. The Arab Conquest of Egypt and the Last Thirty years of Roman Dominion Oxford, 1978.
 
 

646
Nikiou
7th century in the Byzantine Empire
Nikiou
Nikiou
Nikiou
Nikiou
640s in the Byzantine Empire